The Arkalochori Axe is a 2nd millennium BC Minoan bronze votive double axe (labrys) excavated by Spyridon Marinatos in 1934 in the Arkalochori cave on Crete, which is believed to have been used for religious rituals. It is inscribed with fifteen symbols. 

It has been suggested that these symbols might be Linear A, although some scholars disagree. 

The labrys and the Phaistos Disc are conserved in the Heraklion Archaeological Museum. They share some symbols.

Inscription
Of the fifteen signs, two appear to be unique. The following suggestions for comparison with Linear A and Phaistos Disc glyphs are attributed to Torsten Timm (2004). Reading top to bottom, right to left, the symbols are:

Note that reading top to bottom, right to left after turning the inscription counterclockwise gives a different sequence and numbering of the glyphs. The alternative sequence is suggested to be translatable as a text with a dedicatory offering to Tammuz.

See also
 Phaistos Disc
 Dispilio tablet

References

Cretan hieroglyphs
Minoan archaeological artifacts
Axes
Archaeological discoveries in Greece
Ancient Greek metalwork
1934 archaeological discoveries
Minoan art
2nd-millennium BC works
Bronze objects
Heraklion Archaeological Museum
Ancient art in metal